The Hit List is the third album by Saafir, an American hip hop emcee. The Album has been praised by the hip-hop underground for Saafir's Intense Lyricism.

Track listing
 "The Hit List" (R. Gibson/C. Taylor) - 3:40
 Featuring Sonny Black
 "A Dog's Master" (R. Gibson/C. Kent) - 3:48
 Produced by DJ Clark Kent
 "Crawl Before You Ball" (R. Gibson/E. Del-Barrio/G. Jacobs/M. White/V. White) - 3:54
 Produced by Shock-G
 Contains a sample from "Fantasy" performed by Earth, Wind & Fire
 "Watch How Daddy Ball" (R. Gibson/T. Turpin/S. Jordan/C. Miller) - 4:11
 Featuring Kam, Stevie J., Chameleon
 Produced by Stevie J.
 "Slip Into My Eyes" (R. Gibson/J. Fortson/T. Pizarro) - 4:18
 Produced by Tony Pizarro
 "6 Digits" (R. Gibson/C. Broady/J. Bryant/D. Jordan/C. Parker/D. Price/T. Price) - 3:58
 Featuring Cuttthroat, Mr. Doe
 Produced by Carlos "6 July" Broady
 "Not Fa' Nuthin'" (R. Gibson/D. Barbosa/N. Louzides/R. Mounsey) - 4:17
 Featuring Chino XL
 "Pokerface" (R. Gibson/R. Roberts) - 3:42
 "25 Ta Life" (R. Gibson/T. Alston/A. Johnson/K. Muchita) - 2:59
 Featuring Mobb Deep (via vocal sample, not an actual performance)
 "Mask-A-Raid" (R. Gibson/C. Broady/J. Savage) - 4:35
 Featuring Jayo Felony
 Produced by Carlos "6 July" Broady
 "Liquid Ho Magnet" (R. Gibson/G. Jacobs) - 4:52
 Produced by Shock-G
 "Smart Bomb" (R. Gibson/R. Roberts) - 2:49
 "Bedroom Bully" (R. Gibson/J. Carson) - 3:32
 "Runnin' Man" (R. Gibson/G. Jacobs) - 4:36
 Produced by Shock-G
 "Final Thrill" (R. Gibson/T. Alston) - 4:14
Features a dialogue sample from the Chris Cunningham-directed video of Aphex Twin's "Windowlicker."

Personnel

Chart positions

References

External links
 Saafir on MySpace

1999 albums
Saafir albums
Qwest Records albums